John Thomas is an American former Negro league outfielder who played in the 1940s.

Thomas played for the Birmingham Black Barons in 1946 and again the following season. In six recorded games, he posted seven hits in 26 plate appearances.

References

External links
 and Seamheads

Year of birth missing
Place of birth missing
Birmingham Black Barons players
Baseball outfielders